is the tallest mountain in the Izumi Mountains within the Kongō Range, straddling the border between Osaka and Wakayama Prefectures in Japan.

Location and naming
Mount Minami Katsuragi is a remote mountain located on the prefectural border between Kawachinagano, Osaka and Hashimoto, Wakayama, Japan. It is one of the mountains listed as one of the Osaka 50 Mountains, and is the highest peak in Wakayama Prefecture.

Environs
There are not a lot of extreme mountain climbers ascending this peak, so Mount Minami Katsuragi is generally quiet, with few climbers. The sides of the mountain are covered in Japanese cedar and Sasa veitchii, or bamboo grass.

Access and amenities
The summit has a number of benches and chairs from which to view the scenery, including stands of Japanese cedar which surround the overlook. 

There are a number of trails leading up the mountain. The most common routes are listed below: 
The trail from there leads you toward Mount Iwawaki.
This route is much longer than most others as it zigzags a lot while going up the mountain. This route is also the most rugged, steep, strenuous, and dangerous.

Gallery

See also
Mount Izumi Katsuragi
Mount Naka Katsuragi
Mount Yamato Katsuragi

References

External links

Mountains of Wakayama Prefecture
Mountains of Osaka Prefecture